Barraclough  is an English surname. It is derived from the place name Barrowclough, near Halifax in Yorkshire.

People with this surname
Alfred "Alf" Barraclough, rugby union and rugby league footballer who played in the 1890s
Arthur Barraclough (1916–2005), English footballer
Brent Evan Barraclough (born 1962), Canadian-born British classical pianist and film producer
Eleanor Rosamund Barraclough, lecturer in medieval history and literature at Durham University
Elizabeth Barraclough, American musician
Eric Barraclough (1923–1999), English cricketer 
Ernest Barraclough, rugby league footballer who played in the 1920s and 1930s
Fabio Barraclough, Anglo-Spanish academic
Geoffrey Barraclough (1908–1984), British historian
Sir Henry Barraclough (1874–1958), Australian mechanical engineer
Dr. Henry "Barrie" Barraclough, Philadelphia, Pennsylvania, late renowned pianist and composer of religious hymns and Christmas Carols, and for some 50 years Stated Clerk Emeritus of the United Presbyterian Church in the USA   
Jim Barraclough (1926–1995), English rugby league footballer who played in the 1940s and 1950s
Jenny Barraclough, British film and TV producer
John Barraclough (1926–2005), Australian politician
Sir John Barraclough (RAF officer) (1918–2008), British Air Chief Marshal
Kyle Barraclough (born 1990), American baseball player
Nick Barraclough (born 1951), British radio producer, presenter, musician, and writer
Roy Barraclough (1935–2017), English comic actor
William "Bill" Barraclough (1909–1969) English footballer
Mr. Barraclough: George Smiley's cover name in Tinker Tailor Soldier Spy

See also
 Barrowclough
 Barraclough Shield, Australian trophy for interstate rugby matches

References

 English toponymic surnames